Ek Shrimaan Ek Shrimati is a 1969 Indian Bollywood film directed by Bhappi Sonie and produced by Surinder Kapoor. It stars Shashi Kapoor and Babita in pivotal roles.

Plot
Ek Shriman Ek Shrimati is a story about Pritam (Shashi Kapoor) and Deepali (Babita Kapoor). Pritam falls for Deepali who has already chosen Ajit (Prem Chopra) as her life partner. After having a few comical encounters with Deepali's uncle (Om Prakash), Pritam wins the favour of her uncle. Soon with the help of her uncle, Pritam wins the love of Deepali.

Cast
 Shashi Kapoor as Pritam
 Babita as Deepali Lakhanpal
 Rajendra Nath as Ram Bharose Agnihotri
 Prem Chopra as Ajit Choudhary
 Kamini Kaushal as Rama
 Helen as Sherry

Soundtrack

External links

1960s Hindi-language films
1969 films
Films scored by Kalyanji Anandji
Films directed by Bhappi Sonie